Kevin Foote may refer to:

 Kevin Foote (rugby union) (born 1979), South African professional rugby union player and coach
 Kevin Kelly (announcer) (born Kevin Foote, 1967), American wrestling announcer and manager